Highway 224 is a provincial highway in the north-west region of the Canadian province of Saskatchewan. It runs from Highway 26 / Highway 950 to Highway 4 / Highway 904.

Highway 224 is gravelled for its entire length and lies entirely within Meadow Lake Provincial Park, and follows the course of the Waterhen River and provides access to many recreational areas, lakes, and campgrounds. The lakes accessed by the highway include Greig Lake, Rusty Lake, First Mustus Lake, Second Mustus Lake, Kimball Lake, Matheson Lake, Vivian Lake, Peitahigan Lake, and Mistohay Lake.

See also
Roads in Saskatchewan
Transportation in Saskatchewan

References

224